This is a list of All-American Girls Professional Baseball League players who posted the best fielding averages in the history of the circuit.

The career fielding records are based on players who appeared in a minimum of six seasons. The regular season fielding records are based on pitchers throwing in at least 20 games and position players appearing in at least 50 games.

Career records

Single season records

Sources
 All-American Girls Professional Baseball League Record Book – W. C. Madden. Publisher: McFarland & Company, 2000. Format: Softcover, 294pp. Language: English.

See also
All-American Girls Professional Baseball League batting records
All-American Girls Professional Baseball League pitching records

External links
All-American Girls Professional Baseball League records
All-American Girls Professional Baseball League general articles

 
Baseball records